Ian Hill (born 20 January 1951) is an English musician, best known as the bassist and the sole continuous member for the heavy metal band Judas Priest.

Biography
Hill learned how to play the double bass from his father, a bass player for local jazz acts. His father died when he was fifteen. In 1970, together with schoolmate K. K. Downing, Hill formed heavy metal band Judas Priest. He has been playing bass with the band ever since and is now the longest-serving member of the band, following Downing's departure in 2011.

During the early years of the band, he played bass by finger-picking, but since the album Killing Machine he has played with a pick.

Hill is responsible for bringing Rob Halford into Judas Priest. The two met while Hill was dating Halford's sister and mentioned that he needed a new vocalist for his band. Halford accepted, leaving his previous band Hiroshima, and brought along drummer John Hinch, who would later be dropped by the band after one album due to "musical inadequacy", according to Judas Priest's website.

Musical equipment 
In the early years of Judas Priest, Hill played a 1970s Fender Jazz Bass, switching to Hamer in the mid-1980s. Since the late 1980s, Hill has played Spector basses. Spector currently produce an Ian Hill signature bass guitar, based on Hill's NS-2 and fitted with a narrower neck, with an optional tuning of BEAD. He plays using a nylon flatpick of 0.75 mm thickness.

While Hill has used a wide range of different amplifiers through his career, he has been using SWR products since the late 1990s. His current rig consists of two SWR SM1500 amplifiers and four SWR TRIAD cabinets.
During the Jugulator and Demolition recording sessions, Hill used a 5 string Spector bass to access the lower registers needed through the use of down tuned guitars by Tipton and Downing.

Personal life
Hill married Rob Halford's sister, Sue, in 1976 and they divorced in 1984. Together they have a son, Alex, who was born in 1980. Hill lived in Florida while he was married to his second wife, Letitia. They had a daughter with the same name. He met his present wife in 1999, and married in 2006.

When Hill was asked about his reaction to the 2001 film Rock Star, which was originally inspired by the real-life story of Tim "Ripper" Owens, a singer in a Judas Priest tribute band who was chosen to replace singer Rob Halford when he left the band, in an interview with PopMatters magazine, Hill responded "Well, it was a true work of fiction, you know? When we heard about the production company were going to make a movie based, as far as we knew, about Ripper joining the band we offered our help. We said 'If there's anything you want to know, talk to us at the time.' And certainly our communication was cut off and that was it and they went off on their own tangent." Hill added "I mean, I quite enjoyed the movie. [laughs] It was entertaining, you know?" Hill was quoted as saying "It had nothing to do with Rob Halford, Ripper Owens and Judas Priest, it's got nothing to do with that, whatsoever. It was fiction. Apart from the fact that 'Local Boy Makes Good'? That was the only true aspect of the movie." Hill was quick to add "I watched it once. I don't have the urge to watch it again. [laughs]"

He is a supporter of West Bromwich Albion F.C.

Discography

Rocka Rolla (1974)
Sad Wings of Destiny (1976)
Sin After Sin (1977)
Stained Class (1978)
Killing Machine (1978)British Steel (1980)Point of Entry (1981)Screaming for Vengeance (1982)Defenders of the Faith (1984)Turbo (1986)Ram It Down (1988)Painkiller (1990)Jugulator (1997)Demolition (2001)Angel of Retribution (2005)Nostradamus (2008)Redeemer of Souls (2014)Firepower'' (2018)

References

External links

1951 births
Living people
English heavy metal bass guitarists
English rock bass guitarists
Male bass guitarists
Judas Priest members
English people of Scottish descent
People from West Bromwich
Musicians from Birmingham, West Midlands